Behind the Mask: The Unauthorized DVD is a 2002 unauthorized documentary film about the American heavy metal band Slipknot. This one sided disc charts the creation and rise of the band. It has neither subtitles nor closed captions on the release. The documentary looks at the band's early days, their rise to fame, and what they mean to their fans. Due to licensing restrictions, the film features no music or performances by Slipknot.

Personnel
Aside from their real names, members of the band are referred to by numbers zero through eight.
Slipknot
(#0) Sid Wilson – turntables
(#1) Joey Jordison – drums, mixing
(#2) Paul Gray – bass guitar
(#3) Chris Fehn – custom percussion, backing vocals
(#4) Jim Root – guitars
(#5) Craig Jones - samplers, media, mixing
(#6) Shawn Crahan – custom percussion, backing vocals, editing
(#7) Mick Thomson – guitars
(#8) Corey Taylor – vocals

References

2002 documentary films
2002 films
Slipknot (band)
2000s English-language films